The King Abdullah I Mosque in Amman, Jordan was built between 1982 and 1989. It is capped by a magnificent blue mosaic dome beneath which 3,000 Muslims may offer prayer.

Tourists are allowed to visit. Men must have long trousers on and women must cover their heads, arms and legs. A hooded gown is provided free of charge for this purpose.

External links

 King Abdullah I Mosque (Arabic)

1989 establishments in Jordan
Mosques in Amman
Mosques completed in 1989
Mosque buildings with domes
Tourist attractions in Amman